Drebkau is a town in the district of Spree-Neiße, in Lower Lusatia, Brandenburg, Germany. It is situated 14 km southwest of Cottbus.

History
From 1815 to 1947, Drebkau was part of the Prussian Province of Brandenburg. From 1952 to 1990, it was part of the Bezirk Cottbus of East Germany.

Demography

People
 Bogumił Šwjela (1873–1948)

References

Populated places in Spree-Neiße